Walter Charles Marshall, Baron Marshall of Goring  (5 March 1932 in Rumney, Cardiff – 20 February 1996, in London) was a noted theoretical physicist and leader in the UK's energy sector.

Early life

The son of Frank Marshall and Amy Pearson, he attended the grammar school St Illtyd's Boys College 
(now St Illtyd's Catholic High School).

He studied mathematical physics at Birmingham University and gained a PhD there under Rudolf Peierls.

Career
He joined the Theoretical Physics Division at AERE Harwell in 1954, succeeding Brian Flowers as Head of that Division in 1960 and becoming Director of AERE in 1968; he eventually was appointed Chairman of the United Kingdom Atomic Energy Authority in 1981.

CEGB
As a champion of nuclear power, he was appointed, in 1983, to be chairman of the Central Electricity Generating Board. He was also highly sceptical of fusion power, famously noting that "fusion is an idea with infinite possibility and zero chance of success."

In 1989, with the government's plan to reorganise and privatise electricity generation, the position of Chairman of the CEGB disappeared. He was made Chairman of National Power which included a large number of the coal- and oil-fired power stations and all of the nuclear power stations. National Power was a division of the CEGB until it was privatised in 1990. This was done as he had a close association with nuclear power, from the early years. But before the privatisation process was complete, the city was not happy with the nuclear component in National Power, and it was removed from the process and placed into another state-owned company (only to be part privatised some 5 years later). It was as a result of this political decision that he resigned his post as Chairman of National Power. Marshall then entered into several jobs in the private sector connected with the nuclear industry and died in 1996.

As a scientist, Marshall was recognised as one of the leading theoreticians in the atomic properties of matter and characterised by his penetrating analytical powers. He was elected a Fellow of the Royal Society in 1971. In 1977 he was elected a foreign member of the Royal Swedish Academy of Engineering Sciences.

In 1981 he chaired a Task Force, set up with representatives from major interested parties to evaluate the basis for the Sizewell B Design of nuclear power station.

Personal life
In 1955 he married Ann Sheppard in Cardiff and had a son and daughter.

Appointed a Commander of the Order of the British Empire (CBE) in 1973, he was Knighted in 1982.

For his success in keeping the country's “lights on” during the protracted miners’ strike of 1984–5, Margaret Thatcher rewarded him with a life peerage and he became Baron Marshall of Goring, of South Stoke in the County of Oxfordshire on 22 July 1985.

References

External links
 The Marshall papers were catalogued by the NCUACS, Bath, England  and deposited in the Churchill Archives Centre, Cambridge, in 2009. The finding is available in both electronic and analogue form.

1932 births
1996 deaths
Fellows of the Royal Society
Members of the Royal Swedish Academy of Engineering Sciences
Life peers
Maxwell Medal and Prize recipients
Alumni of the University of Birmingham
Scientists from Cardiff
Commanders of the Order of the British Empire
Knights Bachelor
Life peers created by Elizabeth II